Roy Massey (born 10 September 1943) is an English former football player, now a coach.

Career
As a player, Massey played as a centre forward for Rotherham United (1964–67), Leyton Orient (1967–69) and Colchester United (1969–71). He retired from playing football in 1971 but became a coach, first at Colchester United before moving to Norwich City's centre of excellence. In 1999, he moved to Arsenal to become a youth coach there, and he now is head coach for all levels from Under-9 to Under-16.

His grandfather was James Massey, a goalkeeper for Doncaster Rovers and Sheffield Wednesday in the late nineteenth- and early twentieth-century.

References

1943 births
Living people
People from Mexborough
Footballers from Doncaster
Rotherham United F.C. players
Leyton Orient F.C. players
Colchester United F.C. players
Arsenal F.C. non-playing staff
English footballers
Association football forwards